San Lorenzo is a town and seat of the municipality of Dr. Belisario Domínguez, in the northern Mexican state of Chihuahua. As of 2010, the town had a population of 441, up from 308 as of 2005.

References

Populated places in Chihuahua (state)